Swink is a surname. Notable people with the surname include: 

Floyd Swink (1921–2000), American botanist
George W. Swink (1836–1910), American landowner and politician
Jim Swink (1936–2014), American football player
Kitty Swink (born 1954), American actress
Robert Swink (1918–2000), American film editor